The 2017 Purdue Boilermakers baseball team were a baseball team that represented Purdue University in the 2017 NCAA Division I baseball season. The Boilermakers were members of the Big Ten Conference and played their home games at Alexander Field in West Lafayette, Indiana. They were led by first-year head coach Mark Wasikowski. The Boilermakers finished the regular season 29–27 overall and 12–12 in conference play.

Previous season
In 2016, Purdue compiled a 10–44 record (2–22 in conference play) during the regular season, failing to qualify for a postseason for the fourth straight season. On May 21, 2016 Doug Schreiber announced he would be resigning at the end of the season.

On June 24, 2016, Purdue hired Wasikowski to be the head coach of the baseball team. Wasikowski had been an assistant coach at Oregon the previous five seasons. After retaining Wally Crancer, Wasikowski hired Jack Marder as a volunteer assistant. On June 15, 2016, Wasikowski completed his staff with the hiring of Steve Holm as his pitching coach.

Preseason

MLB Draft 
The following Boilermakers on the 2016 roster were selected in the 2016 Major League Baseball draft:

* indicates draftee had no more college eligibility

Roster

Schedule

! style="" | Regular Season
|- valign="top" 

|- bgcolor="#ccffcc"
| 1 || February 17 || Texas State || Bobcat Ballpark • San Marcos, Texas || 9–3 || Andrews (1–0) || Reich (0–1) || None || 2,068 || 1–0 || –
|- bgcolor="#ccffcc"
| 2 || February 18 || Texas State || Bobcat Ballpark • San Marcos, Texas || 12–8 || Parker (1–0) || Lews (0–1) || None || 1,702 || 2–0 || –
|- bgcolor="#ffcccc"
| 3 || February 18 || Texas State || Bobcat Ballpark • San Marcos, Texas || 11–13 || B. Walden (1–0) || Schumacher (0–1) || None || 1,702 || 2–1 || –
|- bgcolor="#ffcccc"
| 4 || February 19 || Texas State || Bobcat Ballpark • San Marcos, Texas || 5–14 || Engle (1–0) || Dellinger (0–1) || None || 1,253 || 2–2 || –
|- bgcolor="#ccffcc"
| 5 || February 24 || Little Rock || Gary Hogan Field • Little Rock, Arkansas || 6–4 || Andrews (2–0) || McDowell (0–2) || Parker (1) || 324 || 3–2 || –
|- bgcolor="#ffcccc"
| 6 || February 25 || Little Rock || Gary Hogan Field • Little Rock, Arkansas || 0–2 || Malcom (1–0) || Stroh (0–1) || Corbett (1) || 389 || 3–3 || –
|- bgcolor="#ffcccc"
| 7 || February 26 || Little Rock || Gary Hogan Field • Little Rock, Arkansas || 0–13 || Fidel (1–1) || Schumacher (0–2) || None || 263 || 3–4 || –
|-

|- bgcolor="#ccffcc"
| 8 || March 3 ||  || Capaha Field • Cape Girardeau, Missouri || 4–0 || Andrews (3–0) || Chander (2–1) || None || 568 || 4–4 || –
|- bgcolor="#ccffcc"
| 9 || March 4 ||  Southeast Missouri State || Capaha Field • Cape Girardeau, Missouri || 13–5 || Stroh (1–1) || Losman (0–1) || Parker (2) || 2,216 || 5–4 || –
|- bgcolor="#ffcccc"
| 10 || March 5 || Southeast Missouri State || Capaha Field • Cape Girardeau, Missouri || 7–17 || Murphy (2–0) || Schumacher (0–2) || None || 314 || 5–5 || –
|- bgcolor="#ffcccc"
| 11 || March 10 ||  || Matador Field • Northridge, California || 8–16 || Weston (3–1) || Andrews (3–1) || None || 260 || 5–6 || –
|- bgcolor="#ffcccc"
| 12 || March 11 || Cal State Northridge || Matador Field • Northridge, California || 1–4 || Myers (2–1) || Stroh (1–2) || None || 284 || 5–7 || –
|- bgcolor="#ffcccc"
| 13 || March 12 || Cal State Northridge || Matador Field • Northridge, California || 4–5 || Vanderford (3–1) || Parker (1–1) || O'Neil (3) || 261 || 5–8 || –
|- bgcolor="#ccffcc"
| 14 || March 13 || Cal State Northridge || Matador Field • Northridge, California || 9–3 || Schweiger (1–0) || Nicol (0–1) || None || 153 || 6–8 || –
|- bgcolor="#ccffcc"
| 15 || March 16 ||  || Stephen Schott Stadium • Santa Clara, California || 12–4 || Learnard (1–0) || Steffens (1–3) || None || 111 || 7–8 || –
|- bgcolor="#ccffcc"
| 16 || March 17 || Santa Clara || Stephen Schott Stadium • Santa Clara, California || 3–0 || Andrews (4–1) || Lex (1–4) || Parker (3) || 123 || 8–8 || –
|- bgcolor="#ccffcc"
| 17 || March 18 || Santa Clara || Stephen Schott Stadium • Santa Clara, California || 8–7 || Williams (1–0) || Buckley (0–1) || Parker (4) || 2017 || 9–8 || –
|- bgcolor="#ccffcc"
| 18 || March 18 || Santa Clara || Stephen Schott Stadium • Santa Clara, California || 10–5 || McGowan (1–0) || Spagnuolo (1–2) || None || 207 || 10–8 || –
|- bgcolor="#ccffcc"
| 19 || March 22 ||  || Ball Diamond • Muncie, Indiana || 16–4 || Dellinger (1–1) || Harmon (0–1) || None || 184 || 11–8 || –
|- bgcolor="#ccffcc"
| 20 || March 24 ||  || Duane Banks Field • Iowa City, Iowa || 2–0 || Parker (2–1) || Robison (1–2) || Williams (1) || 490 || 12–8 || 1–0
|- bgcolor="#ffcccc"
| 21 || March 25 || Iowa || Duane Banks Field • Iowa City, Iowa || 1–5 || Daniels (4–1) || Williams (1–1) || Ritter (2) || 436 || 12–9 || 1–1
|- bgcolor="#ffcccc"
| 22 || March 26 || Iowa || Duane Banks Field • Iowa City, Iowa || 2–7 || Shimp (2–1) || Wojtysiak (0–1) || None || 507 || 12–10 || 1–2
|- bgcolor="#ccffcc"
| 23 || March 28 ||  || Alexander Field • West Lafayette, Indiana || 3–2 || Learnard (2–0) || Spangler (0–1) || None || 646 || 13–10 || 1–2
|- bgcolor="#ffcccc"
| 24 || March 29 ||  || Alexander Field • West Lafayette, Indiana || 1–5 || Inman (3–2) || Schumacher (0–3) || None || 1,055 || 13–11 || 1–2
|- align="center" bgcolor="#ffcccccc"
| 25 || March 31 ||  || Bill Davis Stadium • Columbus, Ohio || 2–13 || Pavlopoulos (2–2) || Andrews (4–2) || None || 661 || 13–12 || 1–3
|-

|- bgcolor="#ccffcc"
| 26 || April 1 || Ohio State || Bill Davis Stadium • Columbus, Ohio || 6–1 || Stroh (2–2) || Feltner (0–5) || Learnard (1) || 683 || 14–12 || 2–3 
|- bgcolor="#ccffcc"
| 27 || April 2 || Ohio State || Bill Davis Stadium • Columbus, Ohio || 2–1 || Kornacker (1–0) || Post (1–2) || Williams (2) || 1,067 || 15–12 || 3–3 
|- bgcolor="#ffcccc"
| 28 || April 4 ||  || Alexander Field • West Lafayette, Indiana || 2–5 || Polly (2–1) || Dellinger (1–2) || Conway (5) || 734 || 15–13 || 3–3
|- bgcolor="#ccffcc"
| 29 || April 7 || Indiana || Alexander Field • West Lafayette, Indiana || 6–5 || Schweiger (2–0) || Lloyd (2–1) || Learnard (2) || 1,299 || 16–13 || 4–3
|- bgcolor="#ccffcc"
| 30 || April 8 || Indiana || Alexander Field • West Lafayette, Indiana || 7–3 || Stroh (3–2) || Hobbie (2–3) || Williams (3) || 2,312 || 17–13 || 5–3
|- bgcolor="#ffcccc"
| 31 || April 9 || Indiana || Alexander Field • West Lafayette, Indiana || 9–14 || Milto (2–2) || Kornacker (1–1) || None || 2,035 || 17–14 || 5–4
|- bgcolor="#ffcccc"
| 32 || April 11 || #2 Louisville || Jim Patterson Stadium • Louisville, Kentucky || 2–13 || Hummel (4–0) || Dellinger (1–3) || None || 1,579 || 17–15 || 5–4
|- bgcolor="#ccffcc"
| 33 || April 14 ||  || Bainton Field • Piscataway, New Jersey || 7–6 || Andrews (5–2) || Rosa (3–3) || Learnard (3) || 373 || 18–15 || 6–4
|- bgcolor="#ffcccc"
| 34 || April 15 || Rutgers || Bainton Field • Piscataway, New Jersey || 6–7 || Brito (2–6) || Stroh (3–3) || Herrmann (5) || 427 || 18–16 || 6–5
|- bgcolor="#ffcccc"
| 35 || April 16 || Rutgers || Bainton Field • Piscataway, New Jersey || 2–8 || O'Rielly (3–5) || Kornacker (1–2) || None || 267 || 18–17 || 6–6
|- bgcolor="#ffcccc"
| 36 || April 18 || Ball State || Alexander Field • West Lafayette, Indiana || 3–5 || Floyd (1–0) || Williams (1–2) || None || 969 || 18–18 || 6–6
|- bgcolor="#ccffcc"
| 37 || April 19 || Indiana State || Sycamore Stadium • Terre Haute, Indiana || 10–7 || Schumacher (1–3) || Larrison (1–2) || Stroh (1) || 898 || 19–18 || 6–6
|- bgcolor="#ccffcc"
| 38 || April 21 ||  || Alexander Field • West Lafayette, Indiana || 4–2 || Andrews (6–2) || Weber (2–4) || Parker (5) || 935 || 20–18 || 7–6
|- bgcolor="#ccffcc"
| 39 || April 22 || Illinois || Alexander Field • West Lafayette, Indiana || 4–1 || Stroh (1–3) || Watson (1–4) || None || 1,153 || 21–18 || 8–6
|- bgcolor="#ccffcc"
| 40 || April 23 || Illinois || Alexander Field • West Lafayette, Indiana || 2–1 || Leonard (3–0) || Thompson (2–2) || None || 1,010 || 22–18 || 9–6
|- bgcolor="#ccffcc"
| 41 || April 25 ||  || Alexander Field • West Lafayette, Indiana || 18–0 || Dellinger (2–3) || Helm (2–2) || None || 811 || 23–18 || 9–6
|- bgcolor="#ccffcc"
| 42 || April 28 ||  || Alexander Field • West Lafayette, Indiana || 5–2 || Andrews (7–2) || Hogan (7–1) || Parker (6) || 575 || 24–18 || 9–6
|- bgcolor="#ccffcc"
| 43 || April 29 || Saint Louis || Alexander Field • West Lafayette, Indiana || 4–3 || Learnard (4–0) || Lefner (0–4) || None || 559 || 25–18 || 9–6
|- bgcolor="#bbbbbb"
| 44 || April 30 || Saint Louis || Alexander Field • West Lafayette, Indiana || Cancelled || – || – || – || – || 25–18 || 9–6
|-

|- bgcolor="#ffcccc"
| 45 || May 5 ||  || Alexander Field • West Lafayette, Indiana || 2–7 || Wetherbee (2–2) || Andrews (7–3) || Hofman (2) || 884 || 25–19 || 9–7
|- bgcolor="#ccffcc"
| 46 || May 6 || Northwestern || Alexander Field • West Lafayette, Indiana || 2–1 || Learnard (5–0) || Lawrence (3–3) || None || 1,078 || 26–19 || 10–7
|- bgcolor="#ffcccc"
| 47 || May 7 || Northwestern || Alexander Field • West Lafayette, Indiana || 7–8 || Lass (2–0) || Dellinger (2–4) || Hofman (3) || 1,133 || 26–20 || 10–8
|- bgcolor="#bbbbbb"
| 48 || May 9 || Valparaiso || Emory G. Bauer Field • Valparaiso, Indiana || Cancelled || – || – || – || – || 26–20 || 10–8
|- bgcolor="#ffcccc"
| 49 || May 10 ||  || Alexander Field • West Lafayette, Indiana || 2–4 || Hubbe (1–0) || Ghiselli (0–1) || Dattolo (4) || 833 || 26–21 || 10–8
|- bgcolor="#ffcccc"
| 50 || May 12 || #16  || Alexander Field • West Lafayette, Indiana || 0–2 || Jaskie (7–2) || Andrews (7–4) || Lamb (11) || 1,144 || 26–22 || 10–9
|- bgcolor="#ffcccc"
| 51 || May 13 || #16 Michigan || Alexander Field • West Lafayette, Indiana || 4–9 || Nutof (6–2) || Stroh (4–4) || None || 1,427 || 26–23 || 10–10
|- bgcolor="#ffcccc"
| 52 || May 14 || #16 Michigan || Alexander Field • West Lafayette, Indiana || 1–5 || Hendrickson (6–2) || Schumacher (1–4) || None || 1,002 || 26–24 || 10–11
|- bgcolor="#ccffcc"
| 53 || May 16 || Fort Wayne || Kokomo Municipal Stadium • Kokomo, Indiana || 9–7 || Learnard (6–0) || Boyd (0–9) || None || 200 || 27–24 || 10–11
|- bgcolor="#ccffcc"
| 54 || May 18 ||  || Siebert Field • Minneapolis, Minnesota || 5–2 || Andrews (8–4) || Gilbreath (5–2) || Learnard (4) || 330 || 28–24 || 11–11
|- bgcolor="#ccffcc"
| 55 || May 19 || Minnesota || Siebert Field • Minneapolis, Minnesota || 11–1 || Stroh (5–4) || Schulze (4–3) || None || – || 29–24 || 12–11
|- bgcolor="#ffcccc"
| 56 || May 19 || Minnesota || Siebert Field • Minneapolis, Minnesota || 2–9 || Meyer (4–1) || Parker (2–2) || None || 496 || 29–25 || 12–12
|-

|-
! style="" | Postseason
|- valign="top" 

|- bgcolor="#ffcccc"
| 57 || May 24 || #23  || Bart Kaufman Field • Bloomington, Indiana || 9–15 || Hohensee 7–4 || Schumacher (1–5) || Palkert (2) || 1,163 || 29–26 || 12–12
|- bgcolor="#ffcccc"
| 58 || May 25 ||  || Bart Kaufman Field • Bloomington, Indiana || 2–5 || Murphy (1–0) || Parker (2–3) || Selmer (8) || 1,467 || 29–27 || 12–12
|-

Awards and honors

Weekly awards

Conference awards

References

Purdue
Purdue Boilermakers baseball seasons